FM 957 or FM is an Icelandic radio station. Owned by Sýn, FM 957 broadcasts on 95.7 MHz, and plays the latest in pop music.

External links
 FM's official website

Radio stations in Iceland